Claud H. Larsen  (December 1, 1892 – December 18, 1964) was a member of the Wisconsin State Assembly.

Biography
Larsen was born in Milwaukee, Wisconsin.  His parent were both immigrants from Norway. He would work for Nordberg Manufacturing Company. A Lutheran, he was a member of the Knights of Pythias. Larsen died in   1964 and was buried at the Arlington Park Cemetery in Greenfield, Wisconsin.

Political career
Larsen was a member of the Assembly from 1939 to 1940. He was affiliated with the Wisconsin Progressive Party.

References

Politicians from Milwaukee
Members of the Wisconsin State Assembly
Wisconsin Progressives (1924)
American Lutherans
American people of Norwegian descent
1892 births
1964 deaths
20th-century American politicians
20th-century Lutherans